This is a list of venues used for professional baseball in Salt Lake City, Utah. The information is a synthesis of the information contained in the references listed.

Walker's Field (orig. opened 1899)
Home of:
Salt Lake White Wings – Inter-Mountain League (1901)
Salt Lake Elders – Pacific National League (mid-1903-1904)
Salt Lake Mormons – Inter-Mountain League (1909) (part-season)
Location: "Main Street, southwest corner Ninth Street South"
or "Main Street, corner American Avenue" (per city directories)
Currently: commercial businesses

Lucas Field orig. Cooley Park
Home of: Salt Lake Skyscrapers – Union Association (1911-1914)
Location: "8th Street South, near Main Street" (per city directories) –
8th Street South (south, first base); buildings and State Street (east, right field); buildings and 7th Street South (north, left field);
buildings and Main Street (west, third base)
Currently: a Sears facility

Bonneville Park orig. Majestic Park
Home of: Salt Lake Bees – Pacific Coast League (1915-1925)
Location: "9th South between Main and State" or "50 East Ninth Street South" (per city directories)
[on site of Salt Palace, which burned in 1910] – 9th Street South (north); State Street (east); American Avenue extension (south); Main Street a.k.a. East Temple Street (west)
Currently: commercial businesses

Derks Field orig. Community Field
Home of:
Salt Lake Bees – Utah–Idaho League (1926-1928)
Salt Lake Bees – Pioneer League (1939-1942, 1946-1957)
Salt Lake Bees – PCL (1958-1965)
Salt Lake Giants / Padres – Pioneer League (1967-1969)
Salt Lake Padres (1970) / Angels (1971-1984) / Gulls (1975-1984) – PCL (1970–1984)
Salt Lake Trappers – Pioneer League (1985-1992)
Location: "13th Street South, 7th and 8th Streets East" (per city directories) –
South West Temple Street (west, first base); West 13th Street (north, third base); South Main Street (east, left field); California Avenue (south, right field)
Currently: Smith's Ballpark

Smith's Ballpark orig. Franklin Quest Field, then Franklin Covey Field, then Spring Mobile Ballpark
Home of: Salt Lake Bees – PCL (1994–present)
Location: 1365 South West Temple Street (west, first base); West 13th Street (north, third base); South Main Street (east, left field)

See also
Lists of baseball parks

References
Peter Filichia, Professional Baseball Franchises, Facts on File, 1993.
Salt Lake City Directories – various years – via Ancestry.com

External links
Sanborn map showing Salt Lake ballpark, 1911
Includes picture of early ballpark
Sanborn map showing Salt Palace, 1911, which became the site of the PCL ballpark
 Sanborn map showing part of Derks Field, 1950

Salt Lake City
Salt Lake City
Baseball
baseball parks